Téras is the sixth studio album by Swedish black metal band Naglfar. It was released on 26 March 2012 through Century Media Records. It is their first album in five years, and their first album as a trio.

Release
Téras was released in different forms by the record label. It was released as a regular CD, as a digital download, as a limited edition deluxe CD digipak including a bonus track and a Naglfar logo patch, and finally as a deluxe gatefold double-LP on 180 gram vinyl (black or red), which included the bonus track and an etching on side D.

Prior to the release of Téras, Century Media Records released a 7" EP, limited to 500 hand-numbered copies. It was titled "An Extension of His Arm and Will", and included the exclusive non-album track "As Long As They Fear".

Track listing

Personnel

Naglfar
 Kristoffer Olivius – vocals
 Andreas Nilsson – guitars
 Marcus E. Norman – guitars, bass, keyboards

Additional personnel
 Dirk Verbeuren – drums
 Matthias Jell – additional vocals ("Bring Out Your Dead")
 Matthias Eklund – mixing
 Göran Finnberg – mastering
 Niklas Sundin – artwork

References

2012 albums
Century Media Records albums
Naglfar (band) albums
Death metal albums by Swedish artists